Enda Heffernan is an Irish hurler who plays for Tipperary Senior Championship club Clonoulty-Rossmore and at inter-county level with the Tipperary senior hurling team.

Career
During the 2022 season, Heffernan made his senior debut for Tipperary. On 20 March 2022, he came on as a substitute in the fifth round of the 2022 National Hurling League against Antrim in a 7-29 to 1-17 win.

References

Living people
Tipperary inter-county hurlers
Year of birth missing (living people)